Cordesville is an unincorporated community in Berkeley County, South Carolina, United States. Cordesville has a post office with ZIP code 29434.

References

Unincorporated communities in Berkeley County, South Carolina
Unincorporated communities in South Carolina